Brian Reginald Paine (26 February 1932 – 25 October 2016) was an Australian rules footballer who played with Essendon in the Victorian Football League (VFL). He later played for Yarraville in the Victorian Football Association (VFA).

Notes

External links 
		

Essendon Football Club past player profile

1932 births
2016 deaths
Australian rules footballers from Victoria (Australia)
Essendon Football Club players
Yarraville Football Club players